Wandering spiders (Ctenidae) are a family of spiders that includes the Brazilian wandering spiders. These spiders have a distinctive longitudinal groove on the top-rear of their oval carapace similar to those of the Amaurobiidae. They are highly defensive and venomous nocturnal hunters. Wandering spiders are known to hunt large prey, for example hylid species Dendropsophus branneri. Despite their notoriety for being dangerous, only a few members of Phoneutria have venom known to be hazardous to humans, but the venoms of this family are poorly known, so all larger ctenids should be treated with caution.

Genera

, the World Spider Catalog accepts the following genera:

Acantheis Thorell, 1891 — Asia
Acanthoctenus Keyserling, 1877 — South America, Central America, Jamaica, Mexico
Africactenus Hyatt, 1954 — Africa, India
Afroneutria Polotow & Jocqué, 2015 — Africa
Amauropelma Raven, Stumkat & Gray, 2001 — Asia, Australia
Amicactenus Henrard & Jocqué, 2017 — Africa
Anahita Karsch, 1879 — Africa, Asia, United States
Ancylometes Bertkau, 1880 — South America, Honduras
Apolania Simon, 1898 — Seychelles
Arctenus Polotow & Jocqué, 2014 — Kenya
Asthenoctenus Simon, 1897 — South America
Bengalla Gray & Thompson, 2001 — Australia
Bulboctenus Pereira, Labarque & Polotow, 2020 — Brazil
Califorctenus Jiménez, Berrian, Polotow & Palacios-Cardiel, 2017
Caloctenus Keyserling, 1877 — Ethiopia, South America
Celaetycheus Simon, 1897 — Brazil
Centroctenus Mello-Leitão, 1929 — South America
Chococtenus Dupérré, 2015 — Ecuador, Colombia
Ciba Bloom, Binford, Esposito, Alayón, Peterson, Nishida, Loubet-Senear & Agnarsson, 2014 — Cuba, Dominican Republic
Ctenus Walckenaer, 1805 — Africa, South America, Oceania, Central America, Asia, North America, Caribbean
Diallomus Simon, 1897 — Sri Lanka
Enoploctenus Simon, 1897 — South America, Saint Vincent and the Grenadines
Gephyroctenus Mello-Leitão, 1936 — Brazil, Peru
Isoctenus Bertkau, 1880 — Brazil, Argentina
Janusia Gray, 1973 — Australia
Kiekie Polotow & Brescovit, 2018 — Colombia, Central America, Mexico
Leptoctenus L. Koch, 1878 — Australia, North America, Panama
Macroctenus Henrard & Jocqué, 2017 — Guinea
Mahafalytenus Silva-Dávila, 2007 — Madagascar
Montescueia Carcavallo & Martínez, 1961 — Argentina
Nimbanahita Henrard & Jocqué, 2017 — Guinea
Nothroctenus Badcock, 1932 — Brazil, Bolivia, Paraguay
Ohvida Polotow & Brescovit, 2009 — Cuba
Parabatinga Polotow & Brescovit, 2009 — South America
Perictenus Henrard & Jocqué, 2017 — Guinea
Petaloctenus Jocqué & Steyn, 1997 — Africa
Phoneutria Perty, 1833 — South America
Phymatoctenus Simon, 1897 — Brazil, Guyana, Costa Rica
Piloctenus Henrard & Jocqué, 2017 — Guinea, Togo, Ivory Coast
Sinoctenus Marusik, Zhang & Omelko, 2012
Spinoctenus Hazzi, Polotow, Brescovit, González-Obando & Simó, 2018
Thoriosa Simon, 1910 — São Tomé and Príncipe, Sierra Leone, Equatorial Guinea
Toca Polotow & Brescovit, 2009 — Brazil
Trogloctenus Lessert, 1935 — Congo
Trujillina Bryant, 1948 — Caribbean
Tuticanus Simon, 1897 — Ecuador, Peru
Viracucha Lehtinen, 1967 — South America
Wiedenmeyeria Schenkel, 1953 — Venezuela

See also
 List of Ctenidae species

References

External links

 World Spider Catalog 8.0: Family Ctenidae
 

Taxa named by Eugen von Keyserling